{{DISPLAYTITLE:C20H28O2}}
The molecular formula C20H28O2 may refer to:

 Alitretinoin
 5α-Dihydronorethisterone
 Dimethyldienolone
 Ethyldienolone
 Ethylestradiol
 Etynodiol
 Isotretinoin, a treatment of acne
 Methandrostenolone
 Methoxydienone
 Nordinone
 Norgesterone
 19-Norprogesterone
 Norvinisterone
 Retinoic acid
 Tetrahydrocannabinol-C4
 Tretinoin